Jacopo Tintoretto — famous painter
 Domenico Tintoretto — his son
 Marietta Robusti (Tintoretta) — his daughter
 Tintoretto (cocktail)